is an underground metro station located in Kanagawa-ku, Yokohama, Kanagawa Prefecture, Japan operated by the Yokohama Municipal Subway’s Blue Line (Line 3). It is 23.9 kilometers from the terminus of the Blue Line at Shōnandai Station.

History
Misuzawa-shimochō Station was opened on March 14, 1985. Platform screen doors were installed in April 2007.

Lines
Yokohama Municipal Subway
Blue Line

Station layout
Misuzawa-shimochō Station has a dual opposed side platforms serving two tracks, located five stories underground.  The station was constructed using the NATM method, with rounded tunnels unusual for Japanese metro systems.

Platforms

Surrounding area
 St. Andrew's Cathedral
 Yokohama Orthodox Church
 Evangelical Lutheran Church Yokohama
 Soshin Girls' School
 Mitsuzawa Nursery School(Mitsuzawa Hoikuen)

References
 Harris, Ken and Clarke, Jackie. Jane's World Railways 2008-2009. Jane's Information Group (2008).

External links
 Mitsuzawa-shimochō Station (Blue Line) 

Railway stations in Kanagawa Prefecture
Railway stations in Japan opened in 1985
Blue Line (Yokohama)